Fortunius (Italicized Fortunio) may be

a Latin patronymic
Cassius Fortunius, son of Fortunato count of Borja (b. 685)
a given name
Fortunius Licetus (1577-1657)
a character in Philodoxus by Leon Battista Alberti
other
Papilio fortunius, a species of Papilio
Fortunio (novel), an 1836 novel by Théophile Gautier
Fortunio (opera), a 1907 opera by André Messager